Sir John Demetrius Morris  (24 December 1902 – 3 July 1956) was an Australian jurist, who was Chief Justice of Tasmania from 1940 until his death in office in 1956.

Early life and education
Morris was born in 1902 in the Melbourne suburb of Hawthorn. He was the third child of James Demetrius Morris, a New Zealander of Greek descent, and his Victorian-born wife Margaret Jane Smith. He was educated at St Patrick's College, East Melbourne, and then studied arts and law at the University of Melbourne.

Legal career
On 7 November 1927, Morris was admitted to the Victorian Bar. In October 1930, he and his new wife, Mary McDermott, moved to Hobart, where Morris was admitted to the Tasmanian Bar. He joined the law firm of Albert Ogilvie, later becoming a partner in the firm with Ogilvie and Nick McKenna, which was renamed Ogilvie, McKenna & Morris in 1931. Morris eventually handled most of the firm's case work when Ogilvie and McKenna shifted their focus to political aspirations, and he left the partnership in 1938 to establish his own legal practice.

In July 1939, the Premier of Tasmania, Edmund Dwyer-Gray appointed Morris to the Supreme Court of Tasmania as acting Chief Justice while Sir Harold Crisp was on long service leave pending his retirement. With Crisp's term concluded in April 1940, Morris was sworn in as Chief Justice on 15 April. He was made Knight Bachelor on 1 January 1943, and upgraded to Knight Commander of the Order of St Michael and St George (KCMG) in 1952. As Chief Justice, Morris oversaw the 1947 case of corruption charges against the Premier, Robert Cosgrove, in which Cosgrove was acquitted of all charges and resumed the premiership in February 1948.

Academic role
On 25 February 1944, Morris was appointed as Chancellor of the University of Tasmania. As Chancellor, he was considered to have improved conditions at the economically disadvantaged institution. In 1952, he appointed Sydney Sparkes Orr as chair of philosophy. In 1954, the university's staff association called for Morris to resign, after he was accused of dominating the council after he overrode the professorial board's refusal to admit a student who had not matriculated with a mathematics subject—the student was Christopher Koch, who later became a well-known author. A royal commission was held in 1955, which recognised Morris' contribution to the university, but criticised him. The strain of these conflicts and criticism exacerbated Morris' already poor health due to over-exertion, and he died from a coronary occlusion at his desk in the Supreme Court chambers on 3 July 1956, aged 53.

References

 

1902 births
1956 deaths
Chief Justices of Tasmania
Judges of the Supreme Court of Tasmania
20th-century Australian judges
Australian barristers
Academic staff of the University of Tasmania
University of Melbourne alumni
Australian Knights Commander of the Order of St Michael and St George
Australian Knights Bachelor
Australian people of New Zealand descent
Australian people of Greek descent
People from Hawthorn, Victoria
Judges from Melbourne